is a railway station on the Nippō Main Line in Ōita City, Ōita Prefecture, Japan. It is operated by JR Kyushu and JR Freight.

Lines

Layout 
The station consists of an island platform serving two tracks at grade. The station building is an old timber structure of traditional Japanese design but is now largely used by JR Freight with only a small portion devoted to passenger waiting area. Access to the island platform is by means of a footbridge. A staffed ticket window is located on the island platform. On both sides of the island platform are numerous sidings used by JR freight.

Management of the passenger facilities at the station has been outsourced to the JR Kyushu Tetsudou Eigyou Co., a wholly owned subsidiary of JR Kyushu specialising in station services. It staffs the ticket booth on the island platform which is equipped with a POS machine but does not have a Midori no Madoguchi facility.

Adjacent stations

History
The Kyushu Railway was nationalised on 1 July 1907. On the same day, this station was opened as an intermediate station on the new track. On 15 December 1923, the Hōshū Main Line was renamed the Nippō Main Line. With the privatization of Japanese National Railways (JNR), the successor of JGR, on 1 April 1987, the station came under the control of JR Kyushu.

Passenger statistics
In fiscal 2016, the station was used by an average of 478 passengers daily (boarding passengers only), and it ranked 249th among the busiest stations of JR Kyushu.

See also
List of railway stations in Japan

References

External links

  

Railway stations in Ōita Prefecture
Railway stations in Japan opened in 1911
Ōita (city)